Mary Rose was a 26-gun ship in the service of the English Navy Royal. After commissioning she mainly served in Home waters. With the outbreak of the English Civil War in 1642 she was in the service of the Parliamentary Forces. She served until wrecked in a storm in 1650.

Mary Rose was the third named vessel since it was used for a 60-gun ship built at Portsmouth in 1509, rebuilt in 1536 and capsized during an engagement with the French off the Isle of Wight on 20 July 1545. She was raised on 11 October 1982 for preservation at Portsmouth.

Construction and specifications
She was built at Deptford Dockyard under the guidance of Master Shipwright William Burrell. She was ordered on 3 February 1623 and launched in 1623. Her tonnage was between 288.6 and 384.8 tons.

Her gun armament was in 1624 24 guns consisting of eight demi-culverines, ten sakers, four minions two falcons plus two fowlers. Her manning was around 120 officers and men in 1624.

Commissioned service

Service in the Navy Royal
She was commissioned in August 1624 under the command of Captain Thomas Wilbraham to scour the coasts of pirates from Dungeness to Portland. In 1625 she was under Lord Wimbledon for the Cadiz expedition. In 1627 Captain Francis Sydenham took over for the expedition to La Rochelle in 1628. In 1635 she had Captain George Carteret as her commander followed by Captain Kenelm Digny for service with Lindsey's Fleet in the English Channel. Captain Jeremy Brett was in command when with the Dutch Fleet in 1636. In 1637 First Captain Lewis Kirke was in command followed by Captain Thomas Trenchfield. In 1639 Captain Thomas Price had the command followed by Captain Richard Swanley. In 1642 Captain Robert Fox had command but was dismissed (Start of English Civil War).

Service in the English Civil War
Later in 1642 she was with the Parliamentary Naval Force under the command of Captain Henry Bethell. In 1643 Captain Richard Blythe took command then Captain William Somaster in 1644 and finally Captain Phineas Pett during 1645 to 1647. Later in 1647 She was under Captain Thomas Harrison sailing with Warwick's Fleet in September 1648. In 1649 she was under Captain Francis Penrose.

Disposition
Mary Rose was wrecked in a storm off the Flanders coast in March 1650.

Notes

Citations

References
 British Warships in the Age of Sail (1603 – 1714), by Rif Winfield, published by Seaforth Publishing, England © Rif Winfield 2009, EPUB , Chapter 4, The Fourth Rates - 'Small Ships', Vessels Acquired from 24 March 1603, Mary Rose
 Ships of the Royal Navy, by J.J. Colledge, revised and updated by Lt-Cdr Ben Warlow and Steve Bush, published by Seaforth Publishing, Barnsley, Great Britain, © the estate of J.J. Colledge, Ben Warlow and Steve Bush 2020, EPUB , Section M (Mary Rose)
 The Arming and Fitting of English Ships of War 1600 - 1815, by Brian Lavery, published by US Naval Institute Press © Brian Lavery 1989, Part V Guns, Type of Guns

 

Ships built in Deptford
1620s ships
Frigates of the Royal Navy
Maritime incidents in 1650